The 2013–14 Serie A1 is the 95th season of the Serie A1, Italy's premier Water polo league.

Team information

The following 12 clubs compete in the Serie A1 during the 2013–14 season:

Regular season

Standings

Pld - Played; W - Won; L - Lost; PF - Points for; PA - Points against; Diff - Difference; Pts - Points.

References

External links
 Italian Water Polo Federaration 

Seasons in Italian water polo competitions
Italy
Serie A1
Serie A1
2013 in water polo
2014 in water polo